Murray Roth (November 2, 1893 - 1938) was a writer and director of films in the United States. Earlier in his career Roth was the writer for film producer and director Bryan Foy but by late the 1920s began directing shorts in Brooklyn such as Lamchops.  He directed several short films for Vitaphone before moving to features including his first in 1933, Don't Bet on Love. Roth also wrote the lyrics to George Gershwin's first published song, "When You Want 'Em, You Can't Get 'Em" .

Filmography
Vitaphone Varieties (1927), author of some of the stories
Lights of New York (1928 film), co-writer with comedian Hugh Herbert 
Lambchops (film) (1929), director (uncredited)
Yamekraw (1930), director (short film)
Don't Bet on Love (1933), director and co-writer
Palooka (film) (1934), co-author of adaptation
Million Dollar Ransom (1934), director
Harold Teen (1934 film) (1934), director
Chinatown Squad (1935), director
Flying Hostess (1936), director
 Ripley's Believe It or Not!, director of first five shorts
Flying Hostess (1936, director)
Pepper (film) (1936), writer with Jefferson Parker and Lamar Trotti
She's Dangerous (1937), original story

Discography
"My Runaway Girl", lyrics

References

American film directors
1893 births
1938 deaths